Hal Jones may refer to:

 Hal Jones (baseball) (born 1936), Major League Baseball first baseman
 Hal Jones (ice hockey) (born 1933), Canadian ice hockey player
 Harold Jones (rugby) (1907–1955), Welsh rugby union and rugby league footballer, known as Hal